Evil Never Dies is a 2014 gangster-horror film written by John Mangan and directed by Martyn Pick, that was originally titled The Haunting of Harry Payne. It stars Tony Scannell, Graham Cole and Katy Manning.

Cast
 Tony Scannell as Harry Payne
 Graham Cole as DI David Bracken
 Katy Manning as Susan Payne
 P.H. Moriarty as Eugene McCann
 Anouska Mond as Angela
 Fliss Walton as DS Belinda Churchill
 Neil Maskell as Sean McCann
 Michael Aston as Charles Drexler
 Peter Barfield as PC Melvyn Mervin
 Judi Daykin as Mother
 John Mangan as Tark 
 Louis Selwyn as Gordon

Release
The film was released on 13 January 2014.

Reception
Critics praised the effects and actors' performances, Scannell's in particular, although others thought the film was too complicated and serious. Other criticisms were that the film was "genre bending" and confused.

References

External links
 

2014 films
2014 horror films
British horror films
2010s English-language films
2010s British films